Sigma Leonis, Latinized from σ Leonis, is a blue-white hued star in the zodiac constellation Leo that is visible to the naked eye with an apparent visual magnitude of 4.0.  Its annual parallax shift of 15.24 mas as seen from Earth implies a distance around 210 light years from the Sun. It is moving closer to the Sun with a radial velocity of –5 km/s.

Chini et al. (2012) list this as a single-lined spectroscopic binary system. The visible component has a stellar classification of B9.5 Vs, indicating it is a B-type main-sequence star. It is a suspected magnetic Ap star that shows an abundance anomaly with the element silicon. Sigma Leonis has an estimated 2.76 times the mass of the Sun and 3.3 times the Sun's radius. It is about 293 million years old with a projected rotational velocity of 70 km/s. The star is radiating 133 times the Sun's luminosity from its photosphere at an effective temperature of 10,250 K.

Name

References

B-type main-sequence stars
Leonis, Sigma
Leo (constellation)
Durchmusterung objects
Leonis, 77
098664
055434
4386